Bonconto Arrondissement is an arrondissement of the Vélingara Department in the Kolda Region of Senegal. It is also spelled Bonkonto.

Subdivisions
The arrondissement is divided administratively into rural communities and in turn into villages. The communes or rural communities (French: communauté rurale) are:

 Bonconto (commune)
 Linkéring
 Médina Gounass
 Sinthiang Koundara

Attractions
 The Al Hassanayni Grand Mosque of Darou Hidjiratou is the largest mosque in Bonconto Arrondissement. It is one of the primary mosques for Shi'i Muslims in Senegal.

Notable people
Notable people:
Cherif Mohamed Aly Aidara, founder of the international NGO Mozdahir

References

Arrondissements of Senegal
Kolda Region